Milano Certosa is a surface railway station in Milan, Italy. The station is on the north-west part of the city between the Quarto Oggiaro and Musocco neighborhoods. Its name comes from the Certosa di Garegnano. The station is located on Via Antonio Mambretti. The train services are operated by Trenord.

The station is the oldest still operating in Milan, and the only one established by the Austrian Empire before the unification of Italy.

Train services
The station is served by the following services:

Milan Metropolitan services (S5) Varese - Rho - Milan - Treviglio
Milan Metropolitan services (S6) Novara - Rho - Milan - Treviglio
Milan Metropolitan services (S11) Rho - Milan - Monza - Seregno - Como - Chiasso

See also
Railway stations in Milan
Milan suburban railway service

References

External links

Certosa
Railway stations opened in 1858
Milan S Lines stations
1858 establishments in Italy
Railway stations in Italy opened in the 19th century